The Warren Block is a historic commercial block at 155 Main Street in Marlborough, Massachusetts. The four-story brick building was built in 1891 for Winslow Warren, owner of the local railway express.  The building was designed to house office spaces on most of the first and second floors, and facilities of the local YMCA, including a gymnasium and reading room.  The building's facade features a distinctive basket-weave style of brickwork.

The building was listed on the National Register of Historic Places in 1983, and included in the Marlborough Center Historic District in 1998.

See also
National Register of Historic Places listings in Marlborough, Massachusetts

References

Commercial blocks on the National Register of Historic Places in Massachusetts
Buildings and structures in Marlborough, Massachusetts
National Register of Historic Places in Middlesex County, Massachusetts
Historic district contributing properties in Massachusetts